The National Roads Authority (NRA) was a state body in Ireland, responsible for the national road network. The NRA was established as part of the Roads Act 1993 and commenced operations on 23 December 1993 in accordance with S.I. 407 of 1993. The NRA merged with the Railway Procurement Agency and was effectively dissolved on 1 August 2015. The merger of the two agencies is called Transport Infrastructure Ireland (TII).

County councils remain responsible for local and regional roads, as well as various tasks like setting speed limits. The NRA, meanwhile, was responsible for the planning, maintenance and construction of National Primary Routes and National Secondary Routes as well as establishing safety measures.

The body also plays an environmental and archaeological role as part of the road building programme, publishing an archaeology magazine, seanda, since 2006. Since 2007 it has managed the eToll toll payment interoperability system operated by Egis Projects.

The NRA was headed by a chief executive officer (CEO) who reported to the NRA's board which in turn reported to the Minister for Transport. There were four departmental heads who reported to the CEO: the Head of Finance and Administration, the Head of Engineering Operations, the Head of PPP (Public Private Partnerships), Strategic Planning and Commercial Operations and the Head of Corporate Affairs and Professional Services.

In the previous decade, the NRA was mainly concerned with the extensive expansion of Ireland's motorway network under the National Development Plan (NDP). The Transport 21 element of the NDP involved improvements to Ireland's transport networks including its roads. The NRA was responsible for making major improvements to key roads, especially the Major Inter-Urban Routes. These routes were the N1/M1 (Dublin - north of Dundalk), the N4/M4/N6/M6 (Dublin - Kinnegad-Galway), the N7/M7 (Dublin-Limerick), the N8/M8 (Portlaoise-Cork) and the N9/M9 (near Naas-Waterford).

Major improvements were also made to many other national primary and national secondary routes, most notably the Atlantic Corridor routes (N15, N17, N18, N20, N24, N25) and the N11/M11 (Dublin - Wexford).

See also
Roads in Ireland
Transport in Ireland

References

External links
Official website

Road transport in the Republic of Ireland
Road authorities
Former state-sponsored bodies of the Republic of Ireland
Transport organisations based in Ireland